Yoshimi is a unisex Japanese given name and can also be used as a surname.

Possible writings
佳美, meaning "excellent, beautiful" 
良美, meaning "good, beautiful" 
好美, meaning "like, beautiful" 
芳美, meaning "fragrant, beautiful"

People with the given name
 Yoshimi (吉見), a guitarist and composer from the pop rock band Funta
, Japanese actress and singer
Yoshimi Hayashi (1923–2006), American lawyer
 Yoshimi Ishibashi (石橋義三, born 1949), a Japanese professional race car driver
 Yoshimi Iwasaki (岩崎良美), a Japanese actress and singer
, Japanese softball player
, Japanese judoka
, Japanese long-distance runner
 Yoshimi P-We or Yoshimi Yokota (横田佳美, born 1968), a Japanese musician and drummer of the rock band Boredoms
, Japanese politician

People with the surname
, Japanese ice hockey player

Fictional characters
 Agent Yoshimi, a character from the television series Duck Dodgers
 Yoshimi Akashi (明石 好美), a character from the manga series  Zettai Karen Children and its anime adaptions
 Yoshimi, a minor character in the manga and anime series  Di Gi Charat 
 Yoshimi Sakanaka (阪中 佳実), a character from the Haruhi Suzumiya series
 Yoshimi Satou (佐藤良美), a character from the video game and anime Tsuyokiss
 Yoshimi Yahagi (矢作好美), a character in the novel, film, and manga Battle Royale
 Yoshimi, title character of The Flaming Lips 2002 album, and song of the same name, Yoshimi Battles the Pink Robots

Places
 Yoshimi, Saitama, a town located in Hiki District, Saitama Prefecture, Japan

Other
 Yoshimi Battles the Pink Robots, a 2002 album by The Flaming Lips
 Yoshimi, a software synthesizer for Linux.

Japanese-language surnames
Japanese unisex given names